John and Patricia Beatty were married American writers, an academic historian and a children's librarian. They wrote several books together until John Beatty's death in 1975, after which Patricia Beatty continued to write until her death in 1991. All Beatty titles have been returned to e-print through Beebliome Books.

John Beatty
John Louis Beatty was born on January 24, 1922, in Portland, Oregon, and later became a history professor. He wrote ten books with his wife Patricia and helped edit a two-volume historical text entitled Heritage of Western Civilization. Beatty served as an assistant professor of history and humanities at the University of California, Riverside and died on March 23, 1975, in Riverside, California.

Patricia Beatty
Patricia Beatty was born August 26, 1922, in Portland, Oregon. She spent part of her life in the Pacific Northwest and occasionally resided on Indian reservations. Beatty graduated from Reed College in Portland and has worked as a children's librarian and a high school teacher. She has written fifty books, ten of which were with her first husband John Beatty. She remarried in 1975 to Carl Uhr, an economics professor at the University of California. She died on July 9, 1991.

Awards and accolades

For Patricia Beatty
1972 Jane Addams Children's Book Award, nomination for Lupita Manana 
1974 California Council Medal from the Southern California Council on Literature for Children and Young People, won
1976 California Council Medal from the Southern California Council on Literature for Children and Young People, won
1983 Literature Medal from the Southern California Council on Literature for Children and Young People for Jonathan down Under, won
1984 Western Writers of America Award, won
1987 Western Writers of America Award, won
1988 Scott O'Dell Award for Historical Fiction for Charley Skedaddle, won

For both Beattys
1963 New York Times One Hundred Outstanding Books for Young People for At the Seven Stars
1965 Commonwealth Club of California Medal for best juvenile by a California author for Campion Towers
1966 Horn Book honor list for A Donkey for the King
1967 Southern California Council on Children's and Young People's Literature Medal for The Young Dirk

Bibliography

By both Beattys
At the Seven Stars (1963)
Squaw Dog (1965) 
 Campion Towers (1965)
A Donkey for the King (1966) 
The Royal Dirk (1966) 
The Queen's Wizard (1967)
Witch Dog (1968)
Pirate Royal (1969)
Holdfast (1972) 
Master Rosalind (1974)
Who Comes to King's Mountain? (1975)

John Beatty alone
Warwick and Holland, Being the Lives of Robert and Henry Rich (1965)
Heritage of Western Civilization Volumes I and II (1982)

Patricia Beatty  alone
Bonanza Girl (1962)
The Nickel-Plated Beauty (1964)
Eight Mules from Monterey (1966)
The Queen's Own Grove (1966)
The Sea Pair (1970)
O the Red Rose Tree (1972)
Red Rock over the River (1973)
The Bad Bell of San Salvador (1973)
How Many Miles to Sundown? (1974)
Rufus, Red Rufus (1975) 

By Crumbs, It's Mine (1976)
Something to Shout About (1976)
Billy Bedamned, Long Gone By (1977)
I Want My Sunday, Stranger (1977) 
Just Some Weeds from the Wilderness (1978)
Lacy Makes a Match (1979)
The Staffordshire Terror (1979)
That's One Ornery Orphan (1980)
Lupita Manana (1981)
Jonathan Down Under (1982)
Melinda Takes a Hand (1983)
The Coach That Never Came (1985) 
Behave Yourself Bethany Brant (1986)  
Charley Skedaddle (1987)
Be Ever Hopeful, Hannalee (1988)
Eben Tyne, Powder Monkey (1990)
Wait for Me, Watch for Me, Eula Bee (1978)
Who Comes with Cannons? (1990)
Jayhawker (1991)
Turn Homeward, Hannalee (1991)
Sarah and Me and the Lady from the Sea (1994)

John and Patricia Beatty Award
The John and Patricia Beatty Award is an award given by the California Library Association. The award was sponsored by Baker and Taylor until 2012 and Better World Books beginning in 2013. The Beatty Award "honors the author of a distinguished book for children or young adults that best promotes an awareness of California and its people". Patricia Beatty contributed towards the initial funding of the award, which was named after her and her husband. The award was first established in 1990 and the winner of the award receives a prize of $500 and an engraved plaque.

References

External links

 
 
 
 

20th-century American historians
20th-century American male writers
20th-century American novelists
American children's writers
American male non-fiction writers
Married couples
Novelists from Oregon
Writers from Portland, Oregon